Remigny is a commune in the Saône-et-Loire department in the region of Bourgogne-Franche-Comté in eastern France.

Wine
There are vineyards within the commune of Remigny which are part of the appellations Chassagne-Montrachet and Santenay, which are named after two neighbouring communes. (There is no Remigny appellation.)

See also
Communes of the Saône-et-Loire department

References

Communes of Saône-et-Loire